Robert O'Neal may refer to:
 Robert O'Neal (American football)
 Robert O'Neal (murderer)

See also
 Robert O'Neill (disambiguation)